Marvin Sinan Büyüksakarya (born 11 April 1995) is a German footballer who plays for Turkish club Turgutluspor.

Career
He made his 3. Liga debut on 14 March 2015.

References

External links
 
 
 

1995 births
Living people
People from Nürtingen
Sportspeople from Stuttgart (region)
Association football defenders
Turkish footballers
Turkey youth international footballers
German people of Turkish descent
German footballers
Germany youth international footballers
VfB Stuttgart II players
SSV Reutlingen 05 players
SC Wiedenbrück 2000 players
VfR Aalen players
Adanaspor footballers
3. Liga players
Regionalliga players
TFF First League players
Footballers from Baden-Württemberg